Tropidion is a genus of beetles in the family Cerambycidae, containing the following species:

 Tropidion abditum Martins, 1968
 Tropidion acanthonotum (Martins, 1962)
 Tropidion argentina Galileo & Martins, 2010
 Tropidion atricolle (Martins, 1962)
 Tropidion aurulentum Martins, 1971
 Tropidion balfourbrownei Martins, 1968
 Tropidion batesi Martins, 1968
 Tropidion bituberculatum (Audinet-Serville, 1834)
 Tropidion boliviensis Galileo & Martins, 2010
 Tropidion breviusculum (Thomson, 1867)
 Tropidion brunniceps (Thomson, 1865)
 Tropidion calciope (Thomson, 1867)
 Tropidion carinicolle (Bates, 1872)
 Tropidion castaneum Martins, 1968
 Tropidion centrale (Martins, 1962)
 Tropidion cinctulum (Bates, 1870)
 Tropidion citrinum Martins, 1968
 Tropidion contortum Martins, 1968
 Tropidion cruentum Martins & Napp, 1986
 Tropidion ecoparaba Martins & Galileo, 2007
 Tropidion elegans (Gounelle, 1909)
 Tropidion enochrum Martins, 1968
 Tropidion epaphum (Berg, 1889)
 Tropidion erythrurum (Martins, 1962)
 Tropidion extraordinarium Martins & Galileo, 1999
 Tropidion fairmairei (Gounelle, 1909)
 Tropidion fernandezi Joly, 1991
 Tropidion festivum (Martins, 1962)
 Tropidion flavipenne (Martins, 1964)
 Tropidion flavipes (Thomson, 1867)
 Tropidion flavum (Martins, 1962)
 Tropidion fuscipenne (Gounelle, 1913)
 Tropidion hermione (Thomson, 1867)
 Tropidion hispidum Martins, 1971
 Tropidion igneicolle (Martins, 1962)
 Tropidion inerme (Martins, 1962)
 Tropidion intermedium (Martins, 1962)
 Tropidion investitum (Martins, 1962)
 Tropidion iuba Martins & Galileo, 2007
 Tropidion kjellanderi (Martins, 1965)
 Tropidion lepidum Martins, 1971
 Tropidion litigiosum Martins, 1968
 Tropidion mirabile Martins, 1971
 Tropidion nordestinum (Martins, 1962)
 Tropidion obesum Martins, 1968
 Tropidion ochraceum Martins & Galileo, 2007
 Tropidion periboeoides (Thomson, 1867)
 Tropidion persimile (Martins, 1960)
 Tropidion personatum (Gounelle, 1909)
 Tropidion pictipenne (Martins, 1962)
 Tropidion pinima Martins & Galileo, 2007
 Tropidion praecipuum Martins, 1971
 Tropidion pubicolle Martins & Napp, 1986
 Tropidion pulvinum Martins, 1968
 Tropidion pusillum (Martins, 1960)
 Tropidion rubricatum (Gounelle, 1909)
 Tropidion rusticum (Gounelle, 1909)
 Tropidion salamis (Thomson, 1867)
 Tropidion semirufum Martins, 1968
 Tropidion signatum (Audinet-Serville, 1834)
 Tropidion silvestre (Martins, 1965)
 Tropidion sipolisi (Gounelle, 1909)
 Tropidion subcruciatum (White, 1855)
 Tropidion supernotatum (Gounelle, 1909)
 Tropidion tendyra Martins & Galileo, 2007
 Tropidion tymauna Martins & Galileo, 2007
 Tropidion validum (Martins, 1962)
 Tropidion vianai Martins, 1971
 Tropidion vicinum (Gounelle, 1913)
 Tropidion xanthocele (Martins, 1962)
 Tropidion zonapterum (Martins, 1962)

References

 
Neoibidionini